Androcydes (or Androkydes, fl. 4th century BCE) was a Greek physician and writer at the time of Alexander the Great. According to Pliny, he advised Alexander to moderate his drinking:

Elsewhere, Androcydes is supposed to have recommended cabbage to counteract the effects of wine. Some attempts have been made to identify this Androcydes with the Androcydes who wrote on Pythagoreanism, as the advice  regarding wine (bad) and cabbage (good) may reflect Pythagorean dietary discipline.

Androcydes, if the same authority is meant, may not have confined himself to writing on medical topics. He is cited by Athenaeus for an etymology of the Greek word kolax, "flatterer," which is taken by one wry prosopographer as evidence of his association with Alexander's court.

References

Physicians of Alexander the Great
Greek medical writers
4th-century BC Greek physicians
4th-century BC writers